W. H. (Herb) Mobberley (1904 – June 26, 1988) was a Canadian football player who played for the Winnipeg Blue Bombers. He won the Grey Cup with Winnipeg in 1935 and 1939.

References

1904 births
1988 deaths
Canadian football ends
Winnipeg Blue Bombers players
Players of Canadian football from Manitoba
Sportspeople from Dudley
Canadian football people from Winnipeg
British emigrants to Canada